The President of India is indirectly elected with Instant-runoff voting by means of an electoral college consisting of the elected members of the Parliament of India and the Legislative assemblies of the States of India and the Union territories (having an elected assembly). The number and value of votes are based on the population in 1971 rather than the current population, as a result of the 42nd Amendment, and extended by the 84th Amendment, with the intention to encourage family planning programs in the states by ensuring that states are not penalised for lowering their population growth and development.

The Vice-President is elected by a different electoral college, consisting of members (elected as well as nominated) of the Lok Sabha and Rajya Sabha.

Composition
The presidential electoral college is made up of the following:
 elected members of the Rajya Sabha (upper house of the Parliament of India);
 elected members of the Lok Sabha (lower house of the Parliament of India);
 elected members of each state's Legislative Assembly (lower house of the state legislature); and
 elected members of each union territory possessing a Legislative assembly (i.e. Delhi, (Jammu & Kashmir not included) and Puducherry etc.)

Weighing of votes
The value of votes cast by elected members of the state legislative assemblies and both houses of parliament are determined by the provisions of article 55(2) of the Constitution of India. The details of number of voters and votes for the presidential election are given below.  Per the 84th Amendment, the 1971 census is used, and will continue to be used until 2026.

The formula for determining the number of votes held by an MLA is:

That is, the average constituency size, determined by the 1971 census, in his/her state or union territory, divided by 1,000.

The number of votes for MLAs are as follows:

Note:- http://eci.nic.in/eci_main/ElectoralLaws/HandBooks/President_Election_08062017.pdf.

The value of an MP's vote is calculated by dividing the total value of all MLAs' votes by the number of MPs. The formula for determining the number of votes held by an MP is:

That is, the total Members of Parliament (Elected) = Lok Sabha (543) + Rajya Sabha (233) = 776
Value of each vote = 549,495 / 776 = 708.11, rounded to 708 
Total value of votes of Parliament = 776 × 708 = 549,408

The number of votes for MPs are as follows:

Total number of votes for Presidential electors are as follows:

References

Presidential elections in India
India